James Mercer (17 January 1916 – 17 September 1985) was a Ghanaian diplomat who was Ambassafor to Israel during the 1960s. He was also a prominent lawyer and businessman, becoming the founding chairman of the now-defunct Ghana Airways.

Early life
Mercer was born in Sekondi-Takoradi, Ghana on 17 January 1916.

Career
Mercer was a prominent lawyer, working during the government of Kwame Nkrumah and beyond. Mercer was a barrister-at-law at the Sekondi Bar, Chairman of the Ghana/Ivory Coast Border Commission and first Chairman of the now-defunct Ghana Airways.
From 24 May 1962 to 1963 he was ambassador to Peking.
From 1 July 1964 to 24 February 1966 he was ambassador to Tel Aviv (Ghana–Israel relations).

Personal life and death
James Mercer was the father of Andrew Egypa Mercer, a current member of parliament for Sekondi and Esther Mercer. He was also the brother of T. M. Kodwo-Mercer, the first Ghanaian High Commissioner to Britain from 1954 to 1956 and uncle of the former Minister of Trade and Industry, Ekwow Spio-Garbrah. James Mercer was also the uncle of late Sally Hayfron, first wife of Robert Mugabe.

James Mercer died on 17 September 1985, at the age of 69.

References 

1916 births
1985 deaths
20th-century Ghanaian lawyers
Alumni of Adisadel College
Ambassadors of Ghana to China
Ambassadors of Ghana to Israel
Ghanaian twins